The 2019–20 season was Preston North End's 140th season in existence, and their fifth consecutive season in the Championship. Along with the Championship, the club also competed in the FA Cup and EFL Cup. The season covered the period from 1 July 2019 to 22 July 2020.

Squad

 All appearances and goals up to date as of 22 July 2020.

Statistics

|-
!colspan=14|Players out on loan:

|-
!colspan=14|Players who left the club:

|}

Goals record

Disciplinary record

Transfers

Transfers in

Loans in

Loans out

Transfers out

Pre-season
PNE announced five pre-season fixtures on 5 June 2019. A home friendly against Southampton was later confirmed and Bolton Wanderers was also added.

Competitions

Championship

League table

Result summary

Results by matchday

Matches
On Thursday, 20 June 2019, the EFL Championship fixtures were revealed.

FA Cup

The third round draw was made live on BBC Two from Etihad Stadium, Micah Richards and Tony Adams conducted the draw.

EFL Cup

The first round draw was made on 20 June. The second round draw was made on 13 August 2019 following the conclusion of all but one first round matches. The third round draw was confirmed on 28 August 2019, live on Sky Sports.

References

Preston North End
Preston North End F.C. seasons